Dūkštas is a city in eastern Lithuania,  north from Ignalina, on the bank of Lake Dūkštas.

Notable people
 Charles Rappoport (1865–1941), militant communist politician, journalist and writer, who lived most of his life in a France
 Jerzy Turonek (1929 – 2019) was a Polish-Belarusian historian.

References

 
Cities in Utena County
Cities in Lithuania
Novoalexandrovsky Uyezd
Wilno Voivodeship (1926–1939)
Ignalina District Municipality